Mark Joseph Budzinski (born August 26, 1973) is an American former Major League Baseball (MLB) outfielder who played with the Cincinnati Reds in 2003, and is currently the first base coach for the Toronto Blue Jays.

Playing career
Budzinski played college baseball at the University of Richmond. In 1994, he played collegiate summer baseball with the Harwich Mariners of the Cape Cod Baseball League. The Cleveland Indians selected Budzinski in the 21st round of the 1995 MLB Draft. Budzinski played professionally for 11 seasons, and he spent the 1997 campaign in the Carolina League as an outfielder for the Kinston Indians. After spending time in the Indians, Cubs, and Brewers systems, Budzinski made his Major League debut with the Cincinnati Reds on August 3, 2003. He appeared in four games before returning to the minor leagues.  Budzinski retired in 2005 and returned to Richmond, Virginia to go into real estate.

Post playing career 
Mark Budzinski returned to professional baseball in 2014 as the manager of the Lake County Captains.  He then served as manager of the Lynchburg Hillcats in the 2015 and 2016 seasons, and the Akron RubberDucks in 2017. Budzinski was hired to the Cleveland Indians' major league coaching staff on December 11, 2017.

On November 26, 2018, Budzinski was hired as the first base coach for the Toronto Blue Jays.

Personal life
Budzinski is married to Monica, with whom he raised three children. His eldest daughter Julia died in July 2022 after a boating accident in the James River near Glen Allen, Virginia at the age of 17.

References

External links

1973 births
Living people
Akron Aeros players
American expatriate baseball people in Canada
Baseball coaches from Maryland
Baseball players from Maryland
Buffalo Bisons (minor league) players
Cincinnati Reds players
Cleveland Indians coaches
Columbus RedStixx players
Harwich Mariners players
Indianapolis Indians players
Iowa Cubs players
Kinston Indians players
Louisville Bats players
Major League Baseball center fielders
Major League Baseball first base coaches
Minor league baseball managers
People from Severna Park, Maryland
Richmond Spiders baseball players
Scranton/Wilkes-Barre Red Barons players
Toronto Blue Jays coaches
Watertown Indians players
West Tennessee Diamond Jaxx players